The mimic honeyeater (Microptilotis analogus) is a species of bird in the family Meliphagidae.
It is widely spread throughout New Guinea.
Its natural habitats are subtropical or tropical moist lowland forests, subtropical or tropical mangrove forests, and subtropical or tropical moist montane forests.

References

mimic honeyeater
Birds of New Guinea
mimic honeyeater
Taxonomy articles created by Polbot
Taxa named by Ludwig Reichenbach